Fabiano de Paula and Mohamed Safwat are the defending champions, but decided not to defend their title.

Seeds

Draw

References
 Main Draw

Morocco Tennis Tour - Mohammedia - Doubles
2014 - Doubles
2015 Morocco Tennis Tour